Hoseynabad-e Khan (also Romanized as Ḩoseynābād-e Khān; also known as Hosein Abad, Ḩoseynābād, and Ḩoseynābād-e Behzādī) is a village in Posht Rud Rural District, in the Central District of Narmashir County, Kerman Province, Iran. At the 2006 census, its population was 104, in 27 families.

References 

Populated places in Narmashir County